is a town located in Fukushima Prefecture, Japan. , the town had an estimated population of 1972, in 1037 households  and a population density of 6.7 persons per km². Kaneyama is noted for its spectacular scenery.

Geography
Kaneyama is located in mountainous northwest of the Aizu region of Fukushima Prefecture, bordered Niigata Prefecture to the west. Kaneyama has no town center, but is an artificial construct made up of a number of small villages scattered alongside the Tadami River. Kaneyama has many hot springs.

Mountains : Mount Mikagura (1386.5 m), Mount Takamori
Rivers : Tadami River
Lakes: Lake Numazawa

Climate
Kaneyama has a humid continental climate (Köppen Dfa) characterized by warm summers and cold winters with heavy snowfall.  The average annual temperature in Kaneyama is 9.1 °C. The average annual rainfall is 1615 mm with September as the wettest month. The temperatures are highest on average in August, at around 23.5 °C, and lowest in January, at around -2.6 °C.

Neighboring municipalities
Fukushima Prefecture
Mishima
Shōwa
Tadami
Nishiaizu
Yanaizu
Niigata Prefecture
Aga

Demographics
Per Japanese census data, the population of Kaneyama peaked in the 1950s and has declined steadily over the past 60 years. It is now roughly a quarter of what it was a century ago.

History
The area of present-day Kaneyama was part of ancient Mutsu Province and formed part of the holdings of Aizu Domain during the Edo period. After the Meiji Restoration, it was organized as part of Ōnuma District in Fukushima Prefecture. After the Meiji restoration, the villages of Yokota, Kawaguchi, Numzawa and Honna were established with the creation of the modern municipalities system on April 1, 1889. These villages merged on July 1, 1955 to form the village of Kaneyama, which was raised to town status on March 31, 1958.

One of the hamlets in the town, Mifuke, on the banks of the Tadami River, was abandoned after being struck by a landslide in April 1964, and is now a ghost town only visited occasionally by tourists and former residents. The displaced people were integrated into the village of Amenuma across the river.

Economy
Hydroelectric power generation from numerous dams on the Tadami River is the primary source of revenue for the town.

Education
Kaneyama has two public elementary schools and one public junior high school operated by the town government. The town has one public high school operated by the Fukushima Prefectural Board of Education.
 Fukushima Prefectural Kawaguchi High School

Transportation

Railway
 JR East – Tadami Line
  -  -  -  -  -  -

Highway

Local attractions
Lake Numazawa
Numazawa Onsen
Oshio Onsen

References

External links

Official Website 

 
Towns in Fukushima Prefecture